Soudaine-Lavinadière is a commune in the Corrèze department in central France.

Population

See also
Communes of the Corrèze department

References

Communes of Corrèze
Corrèze communes articles needing translation from French Wikipedia